Following are the statistics of the Danish Championship League in the 1929–30 season.

Overview
It was contested by 10 teams, and Boldklubben af 1893 won the championship.

League standings

References
Denmark - List of final tables (RSSSF)

1929-30
Den
1